"I Feel It All" is a song by Canadian indie pop singer-songwriter Feist, released as the third single from her third full-length album, The Reminder (2007), in 2008. The song was acclaimed by music critics and appeared on several music charts, peaking at number 47 on the Canadian Hot 100 and number 22 on the US Billboard Triple A chart. The single-shot music video features Feist igniting many oil drums and fireworks as she runs around a field at night.

Song information
The song is amongst the most critically acclaimed from her album. The New Yorker praised its tight instrumental arrangement and Gonzales' subtle production. It was performed live on Jimmy Kimmel Live! on May 15, 2007; the episode was taped on a bus and performed acoustic with a bell set replacing the piano. It was also performed on The Colbert Report on April 28, 2008, and on Late Night with Conan O'Brien on April 30, 2008. It was featured in the 2008 film The Women and in the 2010 film The Last Song. It was also featured on an episode of the MTV series The Hills, in several episodes of the British television sitcom The Inbetweeners, and in an episode of the VH1 celebrity series The Fabulous Life of.... In 2009, a cover version of the song appeared in a television advertisement for MasterFoods in Australia.

Feist is shown playing the song with Broken Social Scene in the 2010 film This Movie Is Broken. It is performed as a duet with bandleader Kevin Drew, and is intertwined with parts of his song "Safety Bricks".

Music video
The video begins with Feist dancing in an open field around stacks of oil drums. During the first few moments, Feist hits an oil drum with a stick, causing fireworks to shoot out from them. In turn, all the other drums light up, and firework shoot onto the sky. For most of the rest of the video, Feist is seen dancing all around the lights produced by the fireworks, which no longer need to be hit to spark. Like in her previous video for "1234", the sounds in this video are not muted—the sounds of the fireworks cracking are perfectly audible. The video ends with an outburst of fog and Feist walking into a body of water. Also, like her previous videos, this one was done in one continuous shot.

Track listings
UK promo CD
 "I Feel It All" (album version) — 3:39
 "I Feel It All" (Diplo's Plastic remix) — 3:50
 "I Feel It All" (Escort remix) — 3:49
 "I Feel It All" (Britt Daniel remix) — 4:41
 "I Feel It All" (Gonzales remix) — 4:34

European CD single
 "I Feel It All" (album version) — 3:39
 "I Feel It All" (Britt Daniel remix) — 4:41
 "I Feel It All" (Gonzales remix) — 4:34
 "I Feel It All" (video) — 3:50

Charts

Certifications

References

External links
 Music video for "I Feel It All"

2007 songs
2008 singles
Canadian pop rock songs
Feist (singer) songs
Polydor Records singles
Songs written by Feist (singer)